Las Lomas is a census-designated place (CDP) in Starr County, Texas, United States. The population was 3,147 at the 2010 census. Las Lomas is one of several colonias in Starr County, within the Rio Grande Valley region. The name is derived from the community's terrain.

Geography
Las Lomas is located at  (26.363943, -98.774670).

Prior to the 2010 census, part of Las Lomas CDP was annexed to the Rio Grande City. As a result, the CDP's total area was reduced to 0.4 square mile (1.036 km2), all land.

Emanuella Grinberg of CNN said that Las Lomas at one time "consisted of dilapidated shacks, trailers or homes in various stages of completion. Homes with no foundations, no floors, no windows, doors, or walls were scattered throughout" the community. Grinberg added that "strong winds stirred up suffocating clouds of dust in the streets" because all of the streets were unpaved. She added that "[s]mall gullies formed when it rained because there was no drainage system. Gangs of teens prowled the area, burning unattended construction sites, stealing TVs or the few households appliances people owned". As of 2011, residents are increasingly gaining basic services.

Demographics

2020 census

As of the 2020 United States census, there were 3,054 people, 548 households, and 458 families residing in the CDP.

2000 census
As of the census of 2000, there were 2,684 people, 629 households, and 598 families residing in the CDP. The population density was 4,817.4 people per square mile (1,850.5/km2). There were 728 housing units at an average density of 1,306.6/sq mi (501.9/km2). The racial makeup of the CDP was 90.13% White, 0.04% Asian, 9.61% from other races, and 0.22% from two or more races. Hispanic or Latino of any race were 99.37% of the population.

There were 629 households, out of which 72.3% had children under the age of 18 living with them, 76.9% were married couples living together, 14.5% had a female householder with no husband present, and 4.8% were non-families. 4.8% of all households were made up of individuals, and 3.5% had someone living alone who was 65 years of age or older. The average household size was 4.27 and the average family size was 4.39.

In the CDP, the population was spread out, with 44.9% under the age of 18, 11.3% from 18 to 24, 27.5% from 25 to 44, 12.9% from 45 to 64, and 3.4% who were 65 years of age or older. The median age was 21 years. For every 100 females, there were 100.7 males. For every 100 females age 18 and over, there were 92.4 males.

The median income for a household in the CDP was $10,927, and the median income for a family was $11,000. Males had a median income of $9,833 versus $9,643 for females. The per capita income for the CDP was $3,877. About 72.6% of families and 70.7% of the population were below the poverty line, including 73.2% of those under age 18 and 51.4% of those age 65 or over.

Many of the original settlers of the community originated from Mexico. As of 2011 64.4% of all of Las Lomas's residents and 85% of Las Lomas residents under the age of 18 were born in the United States. Most residents of Las Lomas are legally in the United States.

Education
Las Lomas is served by the Rio Grande City Grulla Independent School District (formerly Rio Grande City Consolidated Independent School District)

References

Census-designated places in Starr County, Texas
Census-designated places in Texas